Anisus vortex is a species of small freshwater snail, an aquatic gastropod mollusk in the family Planorbidae, the ram's horn snails and their allies.

Description
The shell is only 0.8 to 1.1 mm high and measures up to 9 mm in diameter. It has up to 7 whorls. The shell is flattened at the functional lower side, concave at the upper side. On the top, the whorls are flat, separated only by a slightly pronounced seam. On the bottom, however, the whorls are more curved and separated by a distinct suture. Shell with very sharp keel.

Distribution 
The range of this species is from Europe across the Palearctic to Siberia. It occurs in countries and islands including:
 Belgium
 Czech Republic - least concern (LC) 
 Germany
 Great Britain
 Ireland
 The Netherlands
 Poland
 Slovakia

References

External links
Anisus vortex at Animalbase

Planorbidae
Gastropods described in 1758
Taxa named by Carl Linnaeus